Marinobacter gudaonensis is a Gram-negative and rod-shaped bacterium from the genus of Marinobacter which has been isolated from saline soil which was contaminated with oil from the Shengli Oil Field in China.

References

Further reading

External links
Type strain of Marinobacter gudaonensis at BacDive -  the Bacterial Diversity Metadatabase	

Alteromonadales
Bacteria described in 2007